The Women's 25 metre pistol competition at the 2015 European Games in Baku, Azerbaijan was held on 19 and 20 June at the Baku Shooting Centre.

Schedule
All times are local (UTC+5).

Records

Results

Qualification

Semifinal

Finals

Bronze medal match

Gold medal match

References

External links

Women's 25 metre pistol
Euro